Charles Melvin Price (January 1, 1905 – April 22, 1988) was a member of the United States House of Representatives for over 40 years, from 1945 to his death. He represented Metro East, the Illinois portion of the St. Louis metropolitan area.

Early life
Charles Melvin Price was born in East St. Louis, Illinois on January 1, 1905. After a parochial school education, he graduated from St. Louis University High School and took two years of pre-law coursework at Saint Louis University. He became a sports correspondent for the East St. Louis Journal and later the St. Louis Globe-Democrat. He served as a member of the St. Clair County Board of Supervisors from 1929 to 1931. He served as secretary to Edwin M. Schaefer during the latter's term of office from 1933 to 1943. In October 1943, he voluntarily enlisted in the United States Army. He was stationed at Fort Lee at the time of his election to the United States House of Representatives.

United States House of Representatives
He was elected to Congress in his own right in 1944. 

Most notably, he served as the chairman of the United States House Committee on Armed Services between 1975 and 1985. He lost this position at the beginning of the 99th United States Congress. Overthrowing a committee chairman was not a common occurrence at that time, but a majority of the House Democratic Caucus seemed to feel that the aged Price was no longer up to the job. In addition, Price, while liberal on domestic issues, was notably more supportive of defense spending than most Democrats.  When it came to choosing Price's successor, the Caucus bypassed several other old hawkish members of the committee in favor of Les Aspin, who was not only much younger than Price and other more senior members, but also seemed closer in his defense policy preferences to the majority of the Democratic Caucus.

During his time in Congress, he also chaired the Ethics Committee (1967–76) and the Joint Committee on Atomic Energy (1973–74). He remained in Congress until his death. Congressman Price had a role in enacting the Price-Anderson Nuclear Industries Indemnity Act. He died in 1988 of pancreatic cancer. Price is the namesake of the Melvin Price Locks and Dam, near Alton, Illinois on the Upper Mississippi River, and the Melvin Price Federal Building and United States Courthouse in East St. Louis.

In the special election to succeed Price, fellow Democrat and chairman of the St. Clair County Board, Jerry Costello defeated Republican candidate Robert Gaffner. Costello took office August 9, 1988. He was elected to a full term that November with 53% of the vote.

See also

 List of United States Congress members who died in office (1950–99)

References

External links
Congressional Biographical Dictionary entry
 
Louisa H. Bowen Special Collections and University Archives at Southern Illinois University Edwardsville houses Congressman Price's papers
 

1905 births
1988 deaths
People from East St. Louis, Illinois
Saint Louis University alumni
United States Army personnel of World War II
Democratic Party members of the United States House of Representatives from Illinois
People from Camp Springs, Maryland
Deaths from cancer in Maryland
Deaths from pancreatic cancer
20th-century American politicians